The Old Clark Bridge was a bridge that carried U.S. Route 67 across the Mississippi River between West Alton, Missouri and Alton, Illinois. It was constructed beginning in 1927, was replaced by the Clark Bridge and was demolished in 1994. The bridge was initially a toll bridge.

Notes
 Built by Alton-St. Louis Bridge Company, with construction starting in 1927.
 Closed for major repairs in 1959 and 1975.
 Demolished via explosives on August 21 and September 14, 1994.

See also
 
 
 
 
 List of crossings of the Upper Mississippi River
 Lock and Dam No. 26 (historical)

References

External links
, includes photos of the lock and dam, the old Clark Bridge, and the adjacent swing span rail bridge. All three have been demolished.
Video of the Old Clark Bridge

Truss bridges in the United States
Road bridges in Illinois
Bridges of the United States Numbered Highway System
Bridges completed in 1928
Bridges in St. Charles County, Missouri
Road bridges in Missouri
Buildings and structures demolished in 1994
U.S. Route 67
Former toll bridges in Illinois
Former toll bridges in Missouri
1928 establishments in the United States
Metal bridges in the United States
Bridges in Madison County, Illinois
Interstate vehicle bridges in the United States